David Peter Ryan (born 5 January 1957) is an English former professional footballer who played as a goalkeeper. He played in the English Football League for Port Vale in 1976, on loan from Manchester United. He later played non-League football for Southport, Northwich Victoria, Hyde United and Chorley.

Playing career
Ryan started his career with Manchester United. Whilst with the "Red Devils" he was sent on loan to Port Vale in January 1976, as cover for John Connaughton. He made his debut in a 2–1 defeat by Swindon Town at the County Ground on 17 January, but returned to Old Trafford later that month. Ryan was never handed his competitive debut by Tommy Docherty and later left United to play for Southport and Northwich Victoria. He made one Northern Premier League Premier Division appearance for Hyde United on 28 March 1990, in a 4–2 victory over Shepshed Charterhouse at Ewen Fields. He later played for Chorley.

Coaching career
Ryan worked as the Head Goalkeeping Coach at the Manchester United Academy and served as Head of Football & Community Development from 1992 to 2013. He also did charity work on behalf of Manchester United.

Career statistics
Source:

References

1957 births
Living people
Footballers from Manchester
English footballers
Association football goalkeepers
Manchester United F.C. players
Port Vale F.C. players
Southport F.C. players
Northwich Victoria F.C. players
Chorley F.C. players
Hyde United F.C. players
English Football League players
Northern Premier League players
Association football coaches
Association football goalkeeping coaches
Manchester United F.C. non-playing staff